Murarai Assembly constituency is an assembly constituency in Birbhum district in the Indian state of West Bengal.

Overview
As per orders of the Delimitation Commission, No. 294 Murarai Assembly constituency is composed of the following: Murarai I CD Block, and Amdole, Jajigram, Mitrapur, Nandigram, Paikar I and Paikar II gram panchayats of Murarai II CD Block.

Murarai Assembly constituency is part of No. 42 Birbhum (Lok Sabha constituency).

Election results

2021

2011
In the 2011 elections, Nure Alam Chowdhury of Trinamool Congress defeated his nearest rival Dr. Mohammed Qamre Elahi of CPI(M).

 

.# Swing calculated on Congress+Trinamool Congress vote percentages taken together in 2006.

1977–2006
In the 2006 and 2001 state assembly elections, Dr. Mohammed Qamre Elahi of CPI(M) won the Murarai assembly seat defeating his nearest rival Dr. Motahar Hossain of Congress /Trinamool Congress. Contests in most years were multi cornered but only winners and runners are being mentioned. Dr. Motahar Hossain of Congress defeated Moyazzem Hossain of CPI(M) in 1996, Durgadas Ghosh of CPI(M) in 1991 and 1987, Matiur Rahman of CPI(M) in 1982 and Bazle Ahmed of CPI(M) in 1977.

1951–1972
Dr. Motahar Hossain of Congress won in 1972. Bazle Ahmed of SUC won in 1971 and 1969. B.Ahmad, Independent, won in 1967. Shamsuddin Ahammad of RSP won in 1962. The Murarai seat did not exist in 1957. In independent India's first election in 1951 Jogendra Narayan Das of KMPP won.

References

Assembly constituencies of West Bengal
Politics of Birbhum district